The C. S. Soule House is a historic house at 304 Laurel Avenue in Highland Park, Illinois. The house's builder and construction date are uncertain, but it was most likely built circa 1880. Its first documented resident was C. S. Soule, the pastor at the Highland Park Presbyterian Church and a professor at the Highland Hall women's school; Soule lived in the house from 1880 to 1886. The house has a Gothic Revival design with several front-facing gables, a three-bay window, and an open porch. The property originally had a barn behind the house; this was demolished in 1978, and an attached two-car garage was added the following year.

The house was added to the National Register of Historic Places on September 29, 1982.

References

National Register of Historic Places in Lake County, Illinois
Houses on the National Register of Historic Places in Illinois
Gothic Revival architecture in Illinois
Houses completed in 1880
Highland Park, Illinois